Batsor, also Batshar and Batchar is a village in Nalbari district of the Indian state of Western Assam. It is surrounded by Belsor, Churchuri and Goalpara.

Culture

Language
The primary language is Kamrupi.

Festivals
Domahi, Amati, Durga Puja, Kali Puja (Shyama Puja, Diwali), Holi, Janmastami, Shivratri etc. are major festivals. Vedic culture is widespread in day-to-day life.

Temples 
Many old temples are present, including Kali Mandir, Ma Kamakhya Mandir (south Batsor) and Durga Mandir. Muslim citizens celebrate Eid, Maharam, Fateha etc. Villagers celebrate all religious occasions together.

Transport
The village is connected to Nalbari and Gauhati by bus and other privately owned vehicles. National Highway 31 is to the north and is accessible through south by Hajo-Doulashal road.

See also
 Villages of Nalbari District

References

External links
 

Villages in Nalbari district